Dmytro Dedko (Demetrius Dedko) was a Lord of Ruthenia in 1340 (1323) – 1349. Commonly thought to be a Galician boyar, he could be one of sons of Yuriy I and Varvara (Barbara). Dmytro is possibly the progenitor of Ostrozky family.

Dmytro is mentioned in number of scientific works on history of that period such as "History of Ukraine-Ruthenia" by Mykhailo Hrushevsky, "Die polnische Geschichtschreibung des Mittelalters" by Heinrich Ritter von Zeissberg and others. The Russian historian Alexander Presnyakov argues Hrushevsky's claims that Dmytro was representative of Liubart in Galicia, rather in his declarations Dmytro states that Galician princes are his ancestors.

Among the most solid historical benchmarks signed by Dmytro in 1341 is a document "Letter to residents of Torun" that survived to our days where he calls to revive economical and social relationships between the city of Toruń and Halychyna.

During the Polish-Hungarian aggression against the Kingdom of Ruthenia, Dmytro successfully defended governed territory with support of his brother-in-law Liubartas.

With the death of Dmytro and agreement with the Khan of Golden Horde Janibeg, Casimir III occupied Halychyna in 1349. In return for the Halychyna occupation, Poland promised a tribute to Golden Horde.

Dmytro, son of Yuriy
Ukrainian writer Volodymyr Bilinsky argues that Dmytro Dedko is not a "Galician boyar", but rather a true Lord of Ruthenia and a son of Yuriy I of Galicia. Bilinsky also claims that Dmytro is a father of Danylo Ostrozky.

The writer also says that in the Kingdom of Ruthenia there was a diarchy where one ruler governed in Volhynia, while another governed in Halychyna. Bilinsky states that Dmytro governed Halychyna not since 1340, but rather 1323 after the death of both Andriy and Yuriy II and along with Yuriy-Boleslav Troidenovych (Bolesław Jerzy II of Mazovia).

See also
 Ostrozky family

References

External links
 Dedko, Dmytro in the Internet Encyclopedia of Ukraine
  Handbook on history of Ukraine 
  Dmytro Dedko
  Letter of Dmytro Dedko to residents of Torun
 Bilinsky, V. Ukraine-Ruthenia. Book I: Ancestral land. "Olena Teliha publishing". Kyiv 2013

Year of birth unknown
1349 deaths
Princes of Halych
People from Galicia–Volhynia
Monomakhovichi family
Rurik dynasty
Eastern Orthodox monarchs